Gun-related violence is violence committed with the use of a firearm. Gun-related violence may or may not be considered criminal. Criminal violence includes homicide (except when and where ruled justifiable), assault with a deadly weapon, and suicide, or attempted suicide, depending on jurisdiction. Non-criminal violence includes accidental or unintentional injury and death (except perhaps in cases of criminal negligence). Also generally included in gun violence statistics are military or para-military activities.

According to GunPolicy.org, 75 percent of the world's 875 million guns are civilian controlled. Roughly half of these guns (48 percent) are in the United States, which has the highest rate of gun ownership in the world. Globally, millions are wounded or killed by the use of guns. Assault by firearm resulted in 180,000 deaths in 2013 up from 128,000 deaths in 1990. There were additionally 47,000 unintentional firearm-related deaths in 2013.

Levels of gun-related violence vary greatly among geographical regions, countries, and even sub-nationally. Rates of violent deaths by firearm range from as low as 0.03 and 0.04 per 100,000 population in Singapore and Japan, to 59 and 67 per 100,000 in Honduras and Venezuela. The highest rates of violent deaths by firearm in the world occur in low-income South and Central American countries such as Honduras, Venezuela, Colombia, El Salvador, Guatemala, Brazil and Jamaica.

The United States has the 11th highest rate of gun violence in the world and a gun homicide rate which is 25 times higher than the average respective rates of other high income nations. The United States has a total rate of firearms death which is 50–100 times greater than that of many similarly wealthy nations with strict gun control laws, such as Japan, the United Kingdom, and South Korea. Nearly all studies have found a positive correlation between gun ownership and gun-related homicide and suicide rates.

According to the United Nations, small arms account for roughly half of the weapons used to kill people, and more people die each year from gun-related violence than did in the atomic bombings of Hiroshima and Nagasaki combined. The global death toll from use of guns may be as high as 1,000 dead each day.

Prevention 

A number of ideas have been proposed on how to lessen the incidence of gun-related violence.

Some propose keeping a gun at home to keep one safer. Studies show that guns in the home is associated with an increased risk of violent death in the home. According to the Huffington Post, FBI data shows that gun-related violence is linked to gun ownership and is not a function or byproduct of crime. They stated that the FBI data indicates that less than 10% of gun fatalities would be eliminated if they stopped of all violent crime, and therefore gun violence is caused by too many guns.  Mother Jones reports that "[a] Philadelphia study found that the odds of an assault victim being shot were 4.5 times greater if he carried a gun" and that "[h]is odds of being killed were 4.2 times greater" when armed. Others propose arming civilians to counter mass shootings. FBI research shows that between 2000 and 2013, "In 5 incidents (3.1%), the shooting ended after armed individuals who were not law enforcement personnel exchanged gunfire with the shooters." Another proposal is to expand self defense laws for cases where a person is being aggressed upon, although "those policies have been linked to a 7 to 10% increase in homicides" (that is, shootings where self-defense cannot be claimed). While the CDC has been studying on possible methods of preventing gun violence, they have not come to many conclusions on good gun violence prevention.

Psychiatry is another method seen to help with gun control, It can be used to see the possibility that someone may commit these violent acts. However, it is not a foolproof prevention method that stops gun violence. It is a method that can prevent huge danger warnings from getting access to firearms, but those who have mental illnesses that are not as dangerous, but the people are dangerous, can slip by undetected.

Types

Suicide 

There is a strong relationship between guns in the home, as well as access to guns more generally, and suicide risk, the evidence for which is strongest in the United States. In 2017, almost half of the nation's 47,173 suicides involved a firearm. A 1992 case-control study conducted in Tennessee and Washington found that individuals in a firearm owning home are close to five times more likely to commit suicide than those individuals who do not own firearms. A 2002 study found that access to guns in the home was associated with an increased risk of suicide among middle-aged and older adults, even after controlling for psychiatric illness. As of 2008, there were 12 case-control studies that had been conducted in the U.S., all of which had found that guns in the home were associated with an increased risk of suicide. However, a 1996 New Zealand study found no significant relationship between household guns and suicide. Assessing data from 14 developed countries where gun ownership levels were known, the Harvard Injury Control Research Center found statistically significant correlations between those levels and suicide rates. However, the parallels were lost when data from additional nations was included. A 2006 study found a significant effect of changes in gun ownership rates on gun suicide rates in multiple Western countries. During the 1980s and 1990s, the rate of adolescent suicides with guns caught up with adult rates, and the 75-and-older rate rose above all others. A 2002 study found that 90% of suicide attempts with firearms were successful.

The use of firearms in suicides ranges from less than 10 percent in Australia to 50 percent in the United States, where it is the most common method and where suicides outnumber homicides two to one. Those who purchased a firearm were found to be high risk for suicide within a week of the purchase. The United States has both the highest number of Suicides and Gun ownerships for a developed country and firearms are the most popular method to commit suicide. In the United States when Gun ownerships rise so, too, does suicide by firearm. Suicide can be an impulsive act, 40% of those who survived a suicide attempt said that they only considered suicide up to five minutes before attempting the act. This impulsivity can lead to the use of a firearm as it is seen as a quick and lethal method.

According to U.S. criminologist Gary Kleck, studies that try to link gun ownership to victimology often fail to account for the presence of guns owned by other people. Research by economists John Lott of the U.S. and John Whitley of Australia indicates that safe-storage laws do not appear to affect juvenile accidental gun-related deaths or suicides. In contrast, a 2004 study led by Daniel Webster found that such laws were associated with slight reductions in suicide rates among children. The same study criticized Lott and Whitley's study on the subject for inappropriately using a Tobit model. A committee of the U.S. National Research Council said ecological studies on violence and firearms ownership provide contradictory evidence. The committee wrote: "[Existing] research studies and data include a wealth of descriptive information on homicide, suicide, and firearms, but, because of the limitations of existing data and methods, do not credibly demonstrate a causal relationship between the ownership of firearms and the causes or prevention of criminal violence or suicide."

Intentional homicide 

The United Nations Office on Drugs and Crime (UNODC) defines intentional homicide as "acts in which the perpetrator intended to cause death or serious injury by his or her actions." This excludes deaths: related to conflicts (war); caused by recklessness or negligence; or justifiable, such as in self-defense or by law enforcement in the line of duty. A 2009 report by the Geneva Declaration using UNODC data showed that worldwide firearms were used in an average of 60 percent of all homicides. In the U.S. in 2011, 67 percent of homicide victims were killed by a firearm: 66 percent of single-victim homicides and 79 percent of multiple-victim homicides. In 2009, the United States' homicide rate was reported to be 5.0 per 100,000. A 2016 Harvard study claims that in 2010 the homicide rate was about 7 times higher than that of other high-income countries, and that the US gun homicide rate was 25.2 times higher. Another Harvard study found that higher gun availability was strongly correlated with higher homicide rates across 26 high-income countries. Access to guns is associated with an increased risk of being the victim of homicide. Access to firearms is not the sole contributor to increased homicide rates, however, as one study by the Southern Criminal Justice Association in 2011 found. Equally important seem to be the particular societal conditions in a given area, socio-culturally. These conditions include, but are not limited to societal age structure, economic inequality, cultural symbolism associated with firearms and the cultural value of individual life. A 2001 study examining gun ownership amongst 21 high-income countries found that gun ownership by country was correlated with female firearm homicide rates, but not male firearm and overall homicide rates.

Domestic violence 

Some gun control advocates say that the strongest evidence linking availability of guns to death and injury is found in domestic violence studies, often referring to those by public health policy analyst Arthur Kellermann. In response to suggestions by some that homeowners would be wise to acquire firearms for protection from home invasions, Kellermann investigated in-home homicides in three cities over five years. He found that the risk of a homicide was in fact slightly higher in homes where a handgun was present. The data showed that the risk of a crime of passion or other domestic dispute ending in a fatal injury was higher when a gun was readily available (essentially loaded and unlocked) compared to when no gun was readily available. Kellerman said this increase in mortality overshadowed any protection a gun might have deterring or defending against burglaries or invasions. He also concluded that further research of domestic violence causes and prevention are needed.

Critics of Kellermann's study say that it is more directly a study of domestic violence than of gun ownership. Gary Kleck and others dispute the work. Kleck says that few of the homicides that Kellermann studied were committed with guns belonging to the victim or members of their household, and that it was implausible that victim household gun ownership contributed to their homicide. Instead, according to Kleck, the association that Kellermann found between gun ownership and victimization reflected that people who live in more dangerous circumstances are more likely to be murdered, but also were more likely to have acquired guns for self-protection.

In studies of nonfatal gun use, it was found that guns can contribute to coercive control, which can then escalate into chronic and more severe violence. Guns can have a negative impact on victims even without being discharged. Threats of gun use or showing a weapon can create damaging and long-lasting fear and emotional stress in victims because they are aware of the danger of having an abuser who has access to a gun.

Robbery and assault 

The United Nations Office on Drugs and Crime defines robbery as the theft of property by force or threat of force.  Assault is defined as a physical attack against the body of another person resulting in serious bodily injury.  In the case of gun-related violence, the definitions become more specific and include only robbery and assault committed with the use of a firearm. Firearms are used in this threatening capacity four to six times more than firearms used as a means of protection in fighting crime. Hemenway's figures are disputed by other academics, who assert there are many more defensive uses of firearms than criminal uses.

In terms of occurrence, developed countries have similar rates of assaults and robberies with firearms, whereas the rates of homicides by firearms vary greatly by country.

Accidental 
From 1979 to 1997, almost 30,000 people in the United States alone died from accidental firearm injuries. A disproportionately high number of these deaths occurred in parts of the United States where firearms are more prevalent. Following the Sandy Hook Elementary School Shooting, accidental firearm deaths increased by about five hundred percent until April 2013.

Causes 

Gun violence has many different psychological and external causes that can be attributed to it.

Psychological 
While only about 1 percent of court cases relating to gun violence end in "not guilty by insanity", about 28 percent of people who commit gun violence are found to have some form of mental illness. From Centers of Disease Control and Prevention's report regarding national mental health survey, about 1 in 5 Americans experience mental illness in a given year, and 1 in 25 Americans lives under severe mental health problem, such as schizophrenia, bipolar disorder, or major depression. However, mental illness is not the major cause of gun violence. According to statistics, the United States, with similar rate of mental illness to other high-income countries, has relatively higher rate of firearm homicide, which is approximately 25 times higher; firearm suicide is also 10 times higher than other high-income countries. Even though there are about 14 million people with serious mental illness in the United States, they only take up a small portion of the perpetrator of mass shootings in the nation. Moreover, by eliminating mental illness, the nation's rate of violence would be decreased only by 3%.

External 
External causes that create gun violence are much more prevalent than the mental illnesses, as many of them create "heat of the moment" killings, which make up almost 85% of all gun violence acts. These causes, which tend to be created by other people, such as friends, relatives, acquaintances, and enemies, are much more likely to occur than a random spur of the moment killing. Loner gunmen also have some external motivations as well, as a lack of a social circle may have left them resentful and angry and likely to become dangerous to those around them.

Costs 
Violence committed with guns leads to significant public health, psychological, and economic costs.

Economic 

The economic cost of gun-related violence in the United States is $229 billion a year,  meaning a single murder has average direct costs of almost $450,000, from the police and ambulance at the scene, to the hospital, courts, and prison for the murderer. A 2014 study found that from 2006 to 2010, gun-related injuries in the United States cost $88 billion.

Public health 
Assault by firearm resulted in 180,000 deaths worldwide in 2013, up from 128,000 deaths worldwide in 1990. There were 47,000 unintentional firearm deaths worldwide in 2013.

Emergency medical care is a major contributor to the monetary costs of such violence. It was determined in a study that for every firearm death in the United States for the year beginning 1 June 1992, an average of three firearm-related injuries were treated in hospital emergency departments.

Psychological 
Children exposed to gun-related violence, whether they are victims, perpetrators, or witnesses, can experience negative psychological effects over the short and long terms. Psychological trauma also is common among children who are exposed to high levels of violence in their communities or through the media. Psychologist James Garbarino, who studies children in the U.S. and internationally, found that individuals who experience violence are prone to mental and other health problems, such as post-traumatic stress disorder and sleep deprivation. These problems increase for those who experience violence as children. It is conceivable that over a longer period, physical and emotional sequelae of mass shootings may lead to an array of symptoms and disability among affected individuals and communities who will likely experience lifelong consequences by carrying long-term memories of devastation, violence, injuries, and deaths.

By country

Australia

Port Arthur 
The Port Arthur massacre of 1996 horrified the Australian public. The gunman opened fire on shop owners and tourists, killing 35 people and wounding 23. This massacre sparked new efforts to enforce Australia's laws against guns. The Prime Minister at that time, John Howard, proposed a gun law that prevented the public from having all semi-automatic rifles, all semi-automatic and pump-action shotguns, in addition to a tightly restrictive system of licensing and ownership controls.

The government also bought back guns from people. In 1996–2003 it was estimated they bought back and destroyed nearly 1 million firearms. By the end of 1996, whilst Australia was still reeling from the Port Arthur massacre, the gun law was fully in place. Since then, the number of deaths related to gun-related violence dwindled almost every year. In 1979, 685 people died due to gun violence, and in 1996 it was 516. The numbers continue to drop; however, they were declining also before the gun law was in place.

Sydney Siege 
On the Australia's most mediated gun violence-related incident since Port Arthur, was the 2014 Sydney Hostage Crisis. On 15–16 December 2014, a lone gunman, Man Haron Monis, held hostage 17 customers and employees of a Lindt chocolate café. The perpetrator was on bail at the time, and had previously been convicted of a range of offences.

The following year in August, the New South Wales Government tightened the laws of bail and illegal firearms, creating a new offence for the possession of a stolen firearm, with a maximum of 14 years imprisonment.

Sweden 

Gun violence in Sweden (Swedish: skjutningar or gängskjutningar) increased steeply among males aged 15 to 29 in the two decades prior to 2018, in addition to a rising trend in gun violence there was also a high rate of gun violence in Sweden compared to other countries in Western Europe.

Innocent bystanders

United States 

Gun violence in the United States results in tens of thousands of deaths and injuries annually. In 2013, there were 73,505 nonfatal firearm injuries (23.2 injuries per 100,000 U.S. citizens), and 33,636 deaths due to "injury by firearms" (10.6 deaths per 100,000 U.S. citizens). These deaths consisted of 11,208 homicides, 21,175 suicides, 505 deaths due to accidental or negligent discharge of a firearm, and 281 deaths due to firearms use with "undetermined intent". Of the 2,596,993 total deaths in the US in 2013, 1.3% were related to firearms. The ownership and control of guns are among the most widely debated issues in the country.

In 2010, 67% of all homicides in the U.S. were committed using a firearm. In 2012, there were 8,855 total firearm-related homicides in the US, with 6,371 of those attributed to handguns. In 2012, 64% of all gun-related deaths in the U.S. were suicides. In 2010, there were 19,392 firearm-related suicides, and 11,078 firearm-related homicides in the U.S. In 2010, 358 murders were reported involving a rifle while 6,009 were reported involving a handgun; another 1,939 were reported with an unspecified type of firearm.

Firearms were used to kill 13,286 people in the U.S. in 2015, excluding suicide. Approximately 1.4 million people have been killed using firearms in the U.S. between 1968 and 2011, equivalent to a top 10th largest U.S. city in 2016, falling between the populations of San Antonio and Dallas, Texas.

Compared to 22 other high-income nations, the U.S. gun-related murder rate is 25 times higher. Although it has half the population of the other 22 nations combined, the U.S. had 82 percent of all gun deaths, 90 percent of all women killed with guns, 91 percent of children under 14 and 92 percent of young people between ages 15 and 24 killed with guns. In 2010, gun violence cost U.S. taxpayers approximately $516 million in direct hospital costs.

Gun violence is most common in poor urban areas and frequently associated with gang violence, often involving male juveniles or young adult males. Although mass shootings have been covered extensively in the media, mass shootings in the US account for a small fraction of gun-related deaths and the frequency of these events steadily declined between 1994 and 2007, rising between 2007 and 2013.

Legislation at the federal, state, and local levels has attempted to address gun violence through a variety of methods, including restricting firearms purchases by youths and other "at-risk" populations, setting waiting periods for firearm purchases, establishing gun buyback programs, law enforcement and policing strategies, stiff sentencing of gun law violators, education programs for parents and children, and community-outreach programs. Despite widespread concern about the impacts of gun violence on public health, Congress has prohibited the Centers for Disease Control (CDC) from conducting research that advocates in favor of gun control. The CDC has interpreted this ban to extend to all research on gun violence prevention, and so has not funded any research on this subject since 1996. However the 'Dickey' amendment only restricts the CDC advocating for gun control with government funds. It does not restrict research into gun violence and the causal links between the gun and the violence, however funding has not yet been yet been granted for that purpose, i.e. epidemiology, the CDC requires congressional approval to proceed.

Until the year of 2020, firearms have become the most leading cause of death of children in the U.S. From statistics, there are 4368 children and adolescents up to age 19 have died from gun violence in the year of 2020. On the everyday average, 12 children die from gun violence, and 100 people killed by guns in the United States. Two-thirds of the death from gun violence is homicide. Moreover, there are more Black children that have been killed in mass shooting than white children, which is four times more.

Correlation between increased gun safety and decreased gun violence 
An article released from The Brink, Pioneering Research from Boston University, addresses the correlation between increased availability for gun safety, and its inverse relationship to gun violence, leading to gun violence's decrease in areas with greater gun safety. The article states: "Legislation at the federal, state, and local levels has attempted to address gun violence through a variety of methods, including restricting firearms purchases by youths and other 'at-risk' populations."

Sandy Hook Elementary School shooting 
On December 14, 2012, Adam Lanza shot and killed his mother at her home and then drove to Sandy Hook Elementary School, where he killed 20 children and six adult staff. Lanza committed suicide as police arrived at the school. Lanza had severe mental health issues which were not adequately treated. The event reignited a debate regarding access to firearms by people with mental illness and gun laws in the United States.

Robb Elementary School Shooting 
On May 24, 2022, Salvador Rolando Ramos shot his grandmother and then entered Robb Elementary School in Uvalde, Texas, through a door that is not properly closed. After entering the school, Salvador Rolando Ramos fired over 100 rounds, which resulted in the death of 19 students and 2 teachers. A 11-year-old girl survived by playing dead, when she smeared herself with others' blood. Moreover, before Salvador Rolando Ramos killed one of the teacher, "Good night," he said indifferently. Two days after the mass shooting, Joe, the husband of a teacher named Garcia killed during the shooting, had died due to heart attack. This mass shooting had again drew government's and society's attention toward gun violence and control. There are debates raised after the mass shooting regarding gun control, which the society urged the government to release more gun control laws and reinforce the background checks.

Turkey 
In 2009, more than 1,100 were killed.

In 2012, a Turkish parliament document stated that 85% of the guns in the country were unregistered.

In 2013, more than 1,800 were killed.

In 2015, more than 1,900 people were killed and 1,200 people were injured from guns.

In 2017, more than 2,100 people were killed and 3,500 people were injured.

In 2018, more than 2,200 people were killed and more than 3,700 were injured. The five places with the most incidents were Istanbul, Ankara, Samsun, Adana and Sakarya.

In 2020, more than 2,000 people were killed and more than 3,600 were injured, although there were curfews in the country due to the COVID-19 pandemic. The five cities with the most incidents were Istanbul, Samsun, Adana, İzmir and Bursa. The chairman of the Umut Foundation NGO said that there were 18 million unregistered guns which is 89% of the guns in the country.

In 2021, more than 2,140 people were killed and 3,896 were severely wounded in gun violence incidents in the country.

See also 
 Armed violence reduction
 List of countries by firearm-related death rate
 Global gun cultures
 Gunfire locator
 Gun violence in the United States

References

Further reading 

 Reich, K., Culross P. and Behram R. Children, Youth, and Gun Violence: Analysis and Recommendations. The Future of Children. 
 Gun Violence: Prediction, Prevention, and Policy, APA Report 2013.
   A review considers culture, especially film publicity, as a symptom of gun malaise.

External links 
 Firearm-related deaths in the United States and 35 other high- and upper-middle-income countries Krug, Powell, and Dahlberg (1998)
 Gun ownership, suicide and homicide: An international perspective Killias (1992)
 GunPolicy.org Armed violence and gun laws, country by country
 Guns and suicide: Possible effects of some specific legislation Rich, Young, Fowler et al. (1990)
 Guns, Violent Crime, and Suicide in 21 Countries Killias, van Kesteren, Rindlisbacher (2001)
 State of crime and criminal justice worldwide United Nations (2010)
 World crime trends and emerging issues and responses in the field of crime prevention and criminal justice United Nations (2013)
 Gun Violence Archive (GVA) Data on each verified gun-related incident, with annual statistics
 Report US Anti-gun violence activist art project, Eileen Boxer (2016)

 
Crime
Gun politics
Violence